The 2019 Tour de Corse (also known as the Corsica Linea – Tour de Corse 2019) was a motor racing event for rally cars that was held over four days between 28 and 31 March 2019. It marked the sixty-second running of Tour de Corse and was the fourth round of the 2019 World Rally Championship, World Rally Championship-2 and the newly-created WRC-2 Pro class. It was also the second round of the Junior World Rally Championship.

Reigning World Drivers' and World Co-Drivers' Champions Sébastien Ogier and Julien Ingrassia were the defending rally winners. M-Sport Ford WRT, the team they drove for in 2018, were the defending manufacturers' winners. Jan Kopecký and Pavel Dresler were the defending winners in the World Rally Championship-2 category, but they did not participate in the event. Jean-Baptiste Franceschi and Romain Courbon were the reigning World Rally Championship-3 and defending Junior World Rally Championship winners, but did not defend their titles as they did not take part in the rally.

Thierry Neuville and Nicolas Gilsoul won the Rally Corsica for the second time in their career. Their team, Hyundai Shell Mobis WRT, were the manufacturers' winners. The M-Sport Ford WRT crew of Łukasz Pieniążek and Kamil Heller won the WRC-2 Pro category, while the Italian crew of Fabio Andolfi and Simone Scattolin won the wider WRC-2 class, finishing first in the combined WRC-2 category. The second round of the J-WRC championship was taken by the ADAC Sachsen crew of Julius Tannert and Jürgen Heigl.

Background

Championship standings prior to the event
Ott Tänak and Martin Järveoja led both the drivers' and co-drivers' championships with a four-point ahead of six-time world champions Sébastien Ogier and Julien Ingrassia. Thierry Neuville and Nicolas Gilsoul were third, a further six points behind. In the World Rally Championship for Manufacturers, defending manufacturers' champions Toyota Gazoo Racing WRT held an eight-point lead over Citroën Total WRT.

In the World Rally Championship-2 Pro standings, Gus Greensmith and Elliott Edmondson held a three-point lead ahead of Łukasz Pieniążek and Kamil Heller in the drivers' and co-drivers' standings respectively. Kalle Rovanperä and Jonne Halttunen were third, one point further back. In the manufacturers' championship, M-Sport Ford WRT led Škoda Motorsport by forty-one points, with eleven-point-behind Citroën Total in third.

In the World Rally Championship-2 standings, Ole Christian Veiby and Jonas Andersson led the drivers' and co-drivers' standings by fifteen points respectively. Yoann Bonato and Benjamin Boulloud crew and Benito Guerra and Jaime Zapata crew shared second.

In the Junior-World Rally Championship standings, Tom Kristensson and Henrik Appelskog led Roland Poom and Ken Järveoja by eight points in the drivers' and co-drivers' standings respectively, with Jan Solans and Mauro Barreiro two points further behind in third in their own standings. In the Nations' standings, Sweden were first, eight points cleared of Estonia, with Spain three points further behind in third.

Entry list
The following crews were entered into the rally. The event was open to crews competing in the World Rally Championship, World Rally Championship-2 and WRC-2 Pro, the FIA R-GT Cup, the Junior World Rally Championship, and privateer entries not registered to score points in any championship. Ninety-six crews were registered to compete, including ten competing with World Rally Cars and eighteen in World Rally Championship-2. Two of these crews are nominate to score points in the WRC-2 Pro class. A further thirteen entries were received for the Junior World Rally Championship. The total of ninety-six crews made for the largest entry list for a World Rally Championship event since the 2015 edition of the Tour de Corse, when a total of 123 crews were registered to the event.

Route
The 2019 edition of Tour de Corse features a new route, with up to three-quarters of the route being revised from the 2018 edition.

Itinerary
All dates and times are CET (UTC+1) from 28 to 30 March 2019 and CEST (UTC+2) on 31 March 2019.

Report

World Rally Cars
The very first stage of the first pure tarmac rally of the season was dramatic. Kris Meeke suffered a puncture, while four-time winner Sébastien Loeb slid wide and damaged his suspension. Defending world champion Sébastien Ogier nosed his C3 into the bank and lost about ten seconds. In the afternoon loop, a stage drama happened between Meeke and rally leader Elfyn Evans. Evans caught up to Meeke and got stuck behind him, which saw Evans set a stage time eleven seconds slower than Meeke's Toyota teammate Ott Tänak. Evans dropped behind Thierry Neuville, who was 5.3 seconds behind Tänak, on the leaderboard. Eventually, the stewards decided to credit Evans with the same time as the Estonian, which restored him to first with an unchanged advantage after Leg 1.

Saturday appeared to be a disaster for the overnight leader Tänak, who also suffered a puncture and dropped down to sixth, which handled the lead back to Evans. But the Welshman's lead was short-lived as Neuville charged himself to the top spot in the final stage of the day with a-4.5-second lead. Despite Evans astonishingly fought back, an extremely unfortunate right-front puncture happened to the Welshman at where six kilometers from the finish line, which dropped him straightly down to third, over twenty seconds behind defending world champion Sébastien Ogier. Following Evans' puncture, Neuville snatched his first victory of the season.

Classification

Special stages

Championship standings

World Rally Championship-2 Pro
Kalle Rovanperä led the WRC-2 Pro category as Łukasz Pieniążek suffered an early puncture. However, Rovanperä was forced to retire from the event as he crashed his Fabia out in SS9. In SS12, Pieniążek also retired from the day as he went off the road. But he managed to come back on the final day and took the win.

Classification

Special stages
Results in bold denote first in the RC2 class, the class which both the WRC-2 Pro and WRC-2 championships run to.

Championship standings

World Rally Championship-2
In the WRC-2 category, local driver Eric Camilli dominated the day in a Volkswagen Polo GTI R5 as he won all six stages. However, on Saturday, an early puncture dropped him behind Fabio Andolfi, who led the category after Yoann Bonato's retirement. Wore still, although he reduced the gap to just 5.4 seconds, he still forced to retire from the rally as his Polo was burnt out. Eventually, Fabio Andolfi won the category after he overcame a transmission issue.

Classification

Special stages
Results in bold denote first in the RC2 class, the class which both the WRC-2 Pro and WRC-2 championships run to.

Championship standings

Junior World Rally Championship
Jan Solans started rally impressively, with over six seconds faster than any driver of the class in the first stage. However, a puncture cost him over two minutes and handled championship leader Tom Kristensson a comfortable lead. In the end, Julius Tannert put the rally into his pocket after an intense fight with championship leader Kristensson.

Classification

Special stages

Championship standings

Notes

References

External links

  
 2019 Tour de Corse in e-wrc website
 The official website of the World Rally Championship

France
2019 in French motorsport
March 2019 sports events in France
2019